Bad Girls Club (abbreviated BGC) is a 2006 American reality television series created by Jonathan Murray for the Oxygen network in the United States. The show focused on the altercations and physical confrontations of seven aggressive, quarrelsome, and unruly women. They were featured on the show as "charismatic tough chicks." The cast, deemed "bad girls," would enjoy a luxurious lifestyle in a mansion for three months, during which they obeyed specified rules. Their lives inside and outside of the house were recorded by a production team.

Besides the United States, Bad Girls Club aired by at least seven networks in other countries: Sky Living in the United Kingdom and Ireland, MTV in Australia, New Zealand and Russia, RTL 5 in the Netherlands, TV11 in Sweden, SIC Radical in Portugal, Velvet in the Philippines, and Channel [V] in Southeast Asia. If a cast member violated production rules, she was evicted from the show and often replaced by a new cast member. The fourth season was the series' "breakthrough season" as Oxygen's first series to average over one million viewers per episode.

There were four spin-offs including Bad Girls Road Trip, Tanisha Gets Married, Love Games: Bad Girls Need Love Too, and Bad Girls All-Star Battle. In late 2016, Bad Girls Club was renewed for a seventeenth season titled Bad Girls Club: East Meets West. In February 2017, the series' future was put in limbo, with the network's announcement that it would convert to a true crime programming format, which was instituted in July 2017. When discussing the series' future, Frances Berwick, NBCUniversal Cable Entertainment Lifestyle Networks' president, said, "Bad Girls Club, at this stage, I don't see it on Oxygen linear," suggesting that it could air in a non-linear media form. "Beyond that, we haven't figured it out yet."

Format 
The format for the first season of Bad Girls Club differs from subsequent seasons, but its rules apply in all subsequent seasons. One feature continued from season one was the way the show opened: viewers were shown the biggest and most intense physical altercation of the season, and the program then went back to a time before it happened. This fight usually gives you an idea of who is going to be the baddest, or one of the baddest, girls in the house. This altercation draws in many viewers and keeps them wondering what will happen next.

In the second season, the format of the show changed drastically. The maximum age dropped from 31 to 28. The cast of season two were given mandatory non-profit jobs to help them build a work ethic and to experience the stabilizing effect of being interdependent with others, for example in teamwork and commitment, to equip them for success in later life. Quitting the job or failure to attend resulted in mandatory removal from the show. The girls were given the jobs of planning, decision making, and building cooperation. Season two was the first and only season of the Bad Girls Club to do this, and was also the last to air 30-minute episodes.

The Bad Girls Club creed, introduced in season three, is:

The bad girls typically form cliques, create havoc, book parties in night clubs, and engage in sexual antics while attempting to maintain their personal lives. They come from different backgrounds. Earlier in the series, they try to cope and adjust their behavior to become role models for young women. Some cast members try to accomplish specific goals. Throughout, the bad girls must adapt to frequent mood and behavior changes of their housemates. They interview in reality TV confessionals. They are allowed to contact their families and friends using landline telephones and a computer connected to a large-screen television. However, the cast is prohibited from watching nationally and locally televised programming or using mobile phones. If the cast members engage in violence or break other rules, they are considered for eviction under the show's policy, which is enforced by the producers. Security guards intervene in violent altercations. Other reasons for departure include bullying, ostracism, alienation from other housemates, problems at home, or court proceedings. Multiple bad girls leave in every season. If a bad girl departs early in the season, a replacement bad girl arrives within one or two episodes. Replacement housemates are commonly hazed.

On August 3, 2010, during the OxygenLive TV recap episode, the show combined Facebook and Twitter with a live broadcast. Fans submitted opinions and comments about the show and its cast, which were aired during the 10 pm hour. In January 2011, Oxygen released OxygenLive!, an online talk show hosted by Tanisha Thomas, one of the bad girls of season two. It was broadcast after season six debuted on Oxygen, and focused on the cast of season six, occasionally bringing in bad girls from earlier seasons. Thomas asked the girls several questions to prompt rumors and confessions.

List of cast members 
 Indicates replacement bad girl

Critical reception 
Homophobic slurs caught the attention of media outlets. Adolescents emulated The Bad Girls Club. Mary Mitchell of Sun Times stated that the show was "hazardous to the female psyche" and wrote, "Just like some teens try to emulate rappers in their dress and behavior, the same is true for 'bad girls'." She also commented that the show gives a "distorted picture" of how to live the good life, calling the cast "wannabes" who are "sleeping in a mansion they can't pay for". Mitchell believes that most people know the cast are living "a bogus lifestyle", and assesses the message of the Bad Girls Club as "disturbing".

In 2016, The New York Times released a study of the 50 TV shows with the most Facebook Likes, finding that Bad Girls Club was especially popular in the south, with the greatest popularity in Orangeburg, South Carolina. The show has received negative criticism from African-American viewers, believing that it is "not what being a black woman is all about." Mary Chase Breedlove of Reflector objected that "there are several TV programs devoted to acting as trashy and mean as possible ('Bad Girls' Club, ' ...)". The New York Daily News suggested that Bad Girls Club was the equivalent of professional wrestling. Kris De Leon of BuddyTV described the show as "crude, rude and pointless, but sort of addictive to some people. "

Brian Lowry of Variety thought that the producers made the "wrong decision" when they created the show. He believed that the cast of Bad Girls Club auditioned for the show for their "15 minutes of fame". He said that Bad Girls Club "arrived a little late in this game, on a channel lacking the kind of exposure or public footprint to qualify the show even as the stuff guilty pleasures are made of". Lowry believed that the show "loses" and that Oxygen attracts viewers who generally get drunk at bars and make a scene. He also suggested that "maybe it's time to "BAG" these bad-attitude girls and beat a hasty retreat back to the real world".

Anita Gates of The New York Times referred to Bad Girls Club as "a great argument for bringing back programming with actors". She believed that the "average emotional age" appeared to be 15, in contrast to the girls' real ages. She stated that the "unpleasant villains cancel one another out and actually make badness uninteresting", commenting that their behavior might not be "bad enough". Gates concluded by suggesting that Bad Girls Club is the on-location equivalent of The Jerry Springer Show. Kelly West of Cinemablend stated that Bad Girls Club is "so much fun to watch".

Controversies

Season 4 

During "Off The Wall", the first episode of the fourth season, Natalie Nunn told Annie Andersen that Chris Brown was at a night club that she wanted to attend, and asked Anderson if she was a fan. Anderson said not, because of the domestic violence case that Brown was involved in. Nunn defended Brown, saying "Who cares, Rihanna was a punk bitch, and she got her ass beat for a reason". Nunn called Rihanna a "crazy bitch" and claimed to know her, unlike Anderson. After the episode aired, Brown reportedly stated that he did not know who Nunn was. Nunn questioned this during the reunion show, claiming that Brown had said it because the cast of the show had not yet been revealed. Perez Hilton, the host of the reunion, asked Nunn if Rihanna had confronted her about her comments. Nunn answered yes, stating that the two had argued during a dinner party in New York City. During the reunion, Nunn claimed to have had a "fling" with Brown before the show. Shortly before the end of the reunion, Nunn said that she did not condone domestic violence and apologized if her comment had enraged fans and people who had been victims of it.

Season 5 

During the episode "The Wicked Witch Of Key West", a stranger at a bar offered to buy drinks for Kristen Guinane and Christina Marie Hopkins. He spiked the drinks with PCP hallucinogenic pills, and Guinane became intoxicated. She claimed to have suffered bruises on her body when the man grabbed her and handled her roughly. Guinane reported that the producers of the show did not want to identify the man on television for fear of a lawsuit. She blamed the drug for her hitting cast member Lea Beaulieu in the face, leading to a fight.

After season five had wrapped, Catya Washington was sentenced to jail for possession of a concealed weapon and illegal use of drugs.

Season 6 

During season six production, residents of Sherman Oaks, Los Angeles, complained that noise levels and swearing were unbearable and inappropriate for them and their children to listen to during the night. The residents called local law enforcement agencies four or five times to deal with the late-night disturbances. Clarissa Keller, a Sherman Oaks resident, complained that she had a six-year-old son and did not want him to listen to the swearing. She set up a petition calling for a ban on all production companies in the Sherman Oaks hills. Location managers and production crew declined to discuss the neighbors' complaints. The Bad Girls Club permit required the entire production to abide by a "minimum outdoor activity and noise" rule, but local residents claimed that the show did not keep noise levels down. The house for season six was rented for $20,000 a month. The owner said that he would not allow this type of production to rent his home in the future.

Season 7 

On April 12, 2011, cast member Tasha Malek complained to an on-duty police officer outside the Bad Girls house about the conduct of fellow cast member Nastasia Townsend. She claimed that Townsend had placed her personal belongings into a garbage bag, telling her "she needed to leave the house", and that the incident had escalated into a fight. The two were issued summonses by the police for disturbing the peace and disorderly conduct.

Malek released a statement saying "I don't think it’s right to be gay", offending many fans of the show.

Season 12 
The twelfth season of the Bad Girls Club sparked a debate with The Village Board of Trustees of Highland Park, Illinois, who argued against filming the series in the Chicago North Shore suburb.

Season 15 
During the filming for the fifteenth season of the show, replacement "Bad Girls" Amanda and Victoria Hepperle, who are twins, were brought on the show to replace two previous girls that had left earlier. As the two entered the house, the other castmembers decided to play a prank on them in which they covered the twins in flour. The incident later escalated into a fight and the twins left the house and the show. The twins later filed a lawsuit against the production company, the network, the network's parent company, Atrium Entertainment, the castmembers that were on the show at the time of the incident and 50 unknown individuals. The incident did end up making the final cut and aired on the show but the twins faces were blurred out throughout the entire time they were featured on the show as well as pictures and videos of them that were shown.

Spin-offs

Love Games: Bad Girls Need Love Too 
Love Games: Bad Girls Need Love Too premiered on March 16, 2010. The show follows three past bad girls in their search for true love. The first of the Bad Girls Club, Amber Meade and Sarah Michaels from the third season and Kendra Jones from the fourth season. The season concluded on April 27, 2010. Oxygen renewed the show for a second run, with Tanisha Thomas (from season two of the Bad Girls Club) as the host. In this season, Natalie Nunn (season four), Amber Buell (season three) and Lea Beaulieu (season five) competed for true love. The second season consisted of eight one-hour episodes aired between April 18, 2011, and June 13, 2011. The third season aired on December 5, 2011, with Thomas as host once more, and Kori Koether, Sydney Steinfeldt, and Judi Jai as cast members. Kori Koether and Sydney Steinfeldt were on season six of Bad Girls Club; while Jai was on Season 7. Season 4 aired on November 5, 2012, with Tanisha Thomas as the host yet again. This marked Tanisha's third time being the host in the series. This season also featured Season 8 girls, Danielle "Danni" Victor, Amy Cieslowski, and Camilla Poindexter as the cast members looking for love.

Bad Girls All-Star Battle 
Bad Girls All-Star Battle show features bad girls competing for $100,000 and the title of "Baddest Bad Girl of All Time." The series has the girls divided into two teams, put to the test every week in an array of physical and mental challenges. It is hosted by R&B singer, Ray J. Bad Girls All-Star Battle premiered on May 21, 2013. Bad Girls Club season 10 alumnus Jenniffer "Jenn" Hardwick won the competition, with season 4 alumnus Florina "Flo" Kaja being the runner-up. The second season premiered on January 7, 2014. Season 11 alumnus Tiana Small won the competition, with season 11 alumnus Sarah Oliver being the runner-up.

Other spin-offs 
Bad Girls Road Trip premiered on June 12, 2007. It featured season one cast members Zara Sprankle, Aimee Landi, and Leslie Ramsue touring their respective hometowns in search of casting opportunities for the second season of Bad Girls Club. On the series, they also visited their former housemates.

Bad Girls Club: Flo Gets Married is a one-hour special that centers on season-four cast member Florina "Flo" Kaja, who had a traditional Albanian wedding, and on her pregnancy. It aired on Oxygen on February 28, 2011 and was watched by 859,000 viewers.

A documentary series titled Tanisha Gets Married premiered on May 7, 2012. It follows Bad Girls Club season 2 cast member Tanisha Thomas as she prepares for her wedding. With preparations for the wedding in order, issues arise between Tanisha and her soon-to-be husband Clive. The show covers the family drama that occurs. Former bad girls featured in the series include Natalie Nunn and Florina from season 4, as well as Amber M. from season 3; all appear as bridesmaids. The series also shows how Natalie's and Florina's issues with each other turn violent, and how this affects Tanisha. The series was produced by 495 Productions with SallyAnn Salsano as executive producer.

A webshow Baddies ATL, produced by former cast members Tanisha Thomas and Natalie Nunn, is set to air in 2021 consisting of former Bad girls.

Series overview

Notes

References

External links 

 
 

 
2000s American reality television series
2010s American reality television series
2006 American television series debuts
2017 American television series endings
English-language television shows
Television series by Bunim/Murray Productions
Oxygen (TV channel) original programming
African-American reality television series
Reality television series franchises